The Basketball League of Serbia (abbr. КЛС or KLS), is a top-tier men's professional basketball league in Serbia. Founded in 2006, it is run by the Basketball Federation of Serbia (KSS).

Rules

Competition format
The league, operated by the Basketball Federation of Serbia, consists of two stages: the First League which has 16 teams and the SuperLeague which has 8 teams.

Since the 2017–18 season, the top 8 teams in First League are promoted to Super League with five Serbian teams from the ABA League. Two lowest-placed teams, positioned 15th and 16th in the First League, are relegated to a lower-tier league – Second Basketball League of Serbia. Teams positioned 1st and 2nd in First League will be qualified for the next season's ABA League Second Division. The SuperLeague has 8 clubs divided into 2 groups of 4 teams. The best 4 clubs (top 2 teams from groups A and B each) in the SuperLeague go to the Playoff stage.

The following is the access list for current season:

Arena standards
Currently, clubs must have home arenas with a capacity of a minimum of 1,000 seats.

History

Sponsorship naming 
The League has had several denominations through the years due to its sponsorship:
 Sinalco Basketball League of Serbia: 2006–2007
 Swisslion Basketball League of Serbia: 2007–2009
 Agroživ Basketball League of Serbia: 2011–2013
 Mozzart Basketball League of Serbia: 2016–2019
 Admiral Bet Basketball League of Serbia: 2021–present

Champions
 2006–07 Partizan 
 2007–08 Partizan Igokea 
 2008–09 Partizan Igokea 
 2009–10 Partizan 
 2010–11 Partizan 
 2011–12 Partizan mt:s 
 2012–13 Partizan mt:s 
 2013–14 Partizan 
 2014–15 Crvena zvezda Telekom 
 2015–16 Crvena zvezda Telekom 
 2016–17 Crvena zvezda mts 
 2017–18 Crvena zvezda mts
 2018–19 Crvena zvezda mts
 2019–20 None declared 
 2020–21 Crvena zvezda mts
 2021–22 Crvena zvezda mts

Titles by club

League commissioners
 2006–2011: Tihomir Bubalo
 2011–2013: Predrag Bojić
 2013–present: Darko Jovičić

League CEOs
 2006–2014: Dragan Gogić
 2014–2021: Leon Deleon 
 2021–present: Aleksandar Grujin

Current teams

Standings

First League

SuperLeague Play-off finals

All–time national champions
Total number of national champions won by Serbian clubs. Table includes titles won during the Yugoslav First Federal League (1945–1992) and First League of Serbia and Montenegro (1992–2006) as well.

Statistical leaders

Points

Rebounds

Assists

Awards
BLS First League MVP
BLS Super League MVP
BLS Playoff MVP

Notable players

  Nemanja Aleksandrov
  Stefan Birčević
  Nemanja Bjelica
  Bogdan Bogdanović
  Luka Bogdanović
  Zlatko Bolić
  Branko Cvetković
  Marko Čakarević
  Tadija Dragićević
  Zoran Erceg
  Marko Gudurić
  Milan Gurović
  Nikola Jokić
  Stefan Jović
  Nikola Kalinić
  Raško Katić
  Dušan Kecman
  Marko Kešelj
  Ognjen Kuzmić
  Dragan Labović
  Vladimir Lučić
  Milan Mačvan
  Marko Marinović
  Boban Marjanović
  Stefan Marković
  Branko Milisavljević
  Dragan Milosavljević
  Nemanja Nedović
  Ivan Paunić
  Kosta Perović
  Vuk Radivojević
  Miroslav Raduljica
  Igor Rakočević
  Milovan Raković
  Aleksandar Rašić
  Boris Savović
  Marko Simonović
  Miloš Teodosić
  Milenko Tepić
  Milenko Topić
  Uroš Tripković
  Novica Veličković
  Čedomir Vitkovac
  Rade Zagorac
  Jonah Bolden
  Nathan Jawai
  Aleks Marić
  Steven Marković
  Ratko Varda
  Milt Palacio
  Filip Videnov
  Ivica Zubac
  Jan Veselý
  Jamar Wilson
  Joffrey Lauvergne
  Timothé Luwawu-Cabarrot
  Léo Westermann
  Stéphane Lasme
  Maik Zirbes
  Rawle Marshall
  István Németh
  Dāvis Bertāns
  Corey Webster
  Bo McCalebb
  Pero Antić
  Predrag Samardžiski
  Omar Cook
  Vladimir Dašić
  Predrag Drobnjak
  Aleksandar Pavlović
  Nikola Peković
  Slavko Vraneš
  Jaka Blažič
  Goran Jagodnik
  Edo Murić
  Duşan Çantekin 
  Semih Erden
  Vonteego Cummings
  James Gist
  Dominic James
  Charles Jenkins
  Curtis Jerrells
  Michael Lee
  Quincy Miller
  DeMarcus Nelson
  Lawrence Roberts
  Michael Scott
  David Simon
  Omar Thomas
  Nate Wolters
  Terrico White
  Marcus Williams

See also
 Radivoj Korać Cup
 Basketball Federation of Serbia
 Serbia national basketball team
 Yugoslav Basketball League

References

External links
  
 Basketball League of Serbia at eurobasket.com

 
Serbia
Serbia
Serbia
2006 establishments in Serbia
Professional sports leagues in Serbia